Blaž Habot (born December 13, 2000) is a Slovenian professional basketball player who plays for Cedevita Olimpija of the Slovenian League and the ABA League. He is a 2.06 m tall center.

Career
In 2019, Habot started playing senior basketball with Konjice in the Slovenian third division.

In September 2020, he signed with Hopsi Polzela.

On August 10, 2021, Habot signed a four-year contract with Cedevita Olimpija.

References

External links
 Eurobasket.com profile
 REALGM profile
 PROBALLERS profile

2000 births
Living people
Sportspeople from Maribor
Slovenian men's basketball players
ABA League players
Centers (basketball)
KK Cedevita Olimpija players
Power forwards (basketball)